Malcolm Kittson "Mick" Boon (22 July 1902 – 12 July 1988) was a New Zealand cricketer who played first-class cricket for Canterbury between 1923 and 1927, and represented New Zealand in 1923–24.

Mick Boon was a wicket-keeper and useful lower-order batsman. He was selected to play in both of New Zealand's matches against New South Wales in 1923–24, but after the first match in Christchurch his employer, the Public Trustee, refused to grant him leave to travel to Wellington for the second. His highest first-class score was 72 for Canterbury against Auckland in 1926–27. 

Boon's first-class career ended when he left Christchurch and moved to Gisborne in 1930. He represented Poverty Bay in Hawke Cup cricket in the 1930s. He left Gisborne late in 1937 and moved to Wellington, where he worked in the civil service. Later he returned to Christchurch, where he retired.

Boon also represented Canterbury and New Zealand at lawn bowls.

Boon married Rita Millard in the Christchurch suburb of Linwood in March 1930. He died aged 85 in Christchurch in July 1988.

References

External links

1902 births
1988 deaths
New Zealand cricketers
Pre-1930 New Zealand representative cricketers
Canterbury cricketers
Cricketers from Christchurch
New Zealand male bowls players